FODMAPs or fermentable oligosaccharides, disaccharides, monosaccharides, and polyols are short chain carbohydrates that are poorly absorbed in the small intestine and are prone to absorb water and ferment in the colon. They include short chain oligosaccharide polymers of fructose (fructans) and galactooligosaccharides (GOS, stachyose, raffinose), disaccharides (lactose), monosaccharides (fructose), and sugar alcohols (polyols), such as sorbitol, mannitol, xylitol, and maltitol.<ref  Most FODMAPs are naturally present in food and the human diet, but the polyols may be added artificially in commercially prepared foods and beverages.

FODMAPs may cause digestive discomfort in some people. The reasons are hypersensitivity to luminal distension, and/or a proclivity to excess water retention and gas production and accumulation, but they do not cause intestinal inflammation. In fact, naturally occurring FODMAPs may help avert digestive discomfort for some people because they produce beneficial alterations in the gut flora. They are not the cause of these disorders, but a low-FODMAP diet, restricting FODMAPs, might help to improve digestive symptoms in adults with irritable bowel syndrome (IBS) and other functional gastrointestinal disorders (FGID). Avoiding all FODMAPs long-term may have a detrimental impact on the gut microbiota and metabolome.

FODMAPs, especially fructans, are present in small amounts in gluten-containing grains and have been identified as a possible cause of symptoms in people with non-celiac gluten sensitivity. They are only minor sources of FODMAPs when eaten in the usual standard quantities in the daily diet. As of 2019, reviews conclude that although FODMAPs present in wheat and related grains may play a role in non-celiac gluten sensitivity, they only explain certain gastrointestinal symptoms, such as bloating, but not the extra-digestive symptoms that people with non-celiac gluten sensitivity may develop, such as neurological disorders, fibromyalgia, psychological disturbances, and dermatitis. The use of a low FODMAP diet without a previous medical evaluation could cause health risks because it can ameliorate and mask digestive symptoms of celiac disease, delaying or avoiding its correct diagnosis and therapy.

Absorption
Some FODMAPs, such as fructose, are readily absorbed in the small intestine of humans via GLUT receptors. Absorption thus depends on the appropriate expression and delivery of these receptors in the intestinal enterocyte to both the apical surface, contacting the lumen of the intestine (e.g. GLUT5), and to the basal membrane, contacting the blood (e.g. GLUT2). Improper absorption of these FODMAPS in the small intestine leaves them available for absorption by gut flora. The resultant metabolism by the gut flora leads to production of gas and potentially results in bloating and flatulence.

Nevertheless, although FODMAPs can cause certain digestive discomfort in some people, not only do they not cause intestinal inflammation, but they help to prevent it because they produce beneficial alterations in the intestinal flora that contribute to maintain the good health of the colon.

FODMAPs are not the cause of irritable bowel syndrome nor other functional gastrointestinal disorders, but rather a person develops symptoms when the underlying bowel response is exaggerated or abnormal.

Fructose malabsorption and lactose intolerance may produce IBS symptoms through the same mechanism but, unlike with other FODMAPs, poor absorption of fructose is found in only a minority. Lactose intolerance is found in a majority of adults with the exception of certain geographic populations, notably those of European descent. Many who benefit from a low FODMAP diet need not restrict fructose or lactose. It is possible to identify these two conditions with hydrogen and methane breath testing and thus eliminate the necessity for dietary compliance if possible.

Sources in the diet
The significance of sources of FODMAPs varies through differences in dietary groups such as geography, ethnicity, and other factors. Commonly used FODMAPs comprise the following:
 oligosaccharides, including fructans and galacto-oligosaccharides
 disaccharides, including lactose
 monosaccharides, including fructose
 polyols, including sorbitol, xylitol, and mannitol

Fructans, galactans, and polyols

Sources of fructans
Sources of fructans include wheat, rye, barley, onion, garlic, Jerusalem and globe artichoke, beetroot, dandelion leaves, the white part of leeks, the white part of spring onion, brussels sprouts, savoy cabbage, and prebiotics such as fructooligosaccharides (FOS), oligofructose and inulin. Asparagus, fennel, red cabbage and radicchio contain moderate amounts but may be eaten if the advised portion size is observed.

Sources of galactans
Pulses and beans are the main dietary sources (although green beans, canned lentils, sprouted mung beans, tofu (not silken), and tempeh contain comparatively low amounts). Supplements of the enzyme supplement alpha-galactosidase may reduce symptoms  if brands containing other FODMAPs, such as polyol artificial sweeteners, are avoided.

Sources of polyols
Polyols are found naturally in some fruit (particularly stone fruits), including apples, apricots, avocados, blackberries, cherries, lychees, nectarines, peaches, pears, plums, prunes, watermelon, and in some vegetables, including cauliflower, mushrooms, snow peas and mange-tout peas. Cabbage, chicory, and fennel contain moderate amounts, but may be eaten in a low-FODMAP diet if the advised portion size is observed.

Polyols used artificially as bulk sweeteners added to commercially prepared food and beverages include isomalt, maltitol, mannitol, sorbitol and xylitol. As noted above, they exacerbate the effect of galactans when consumed.

Fructose and lactose

People following a low-FODMAP diet may be able to tolerate moderate amounts of fructose and lactose, particularly if they have lactase persistence.

Sources of fructose

Sources of lactose

Low-FODMAP diet

A low-FODMAP diet consists in the global restriction of all fermentable carbohydrates (FODMAPs), that is recommended only for a short time. A low-FODMAP diet is recommended for managing patients with irritable bowel syndrome (IBS) and can reduce digestive symptoms of IBS including bloating  and flatulence.

A low-FODMAP improves digestive symptoms in adults with irritable bowel syndrome in several studies, but its long-term use can have negative effects because it causes a detrimental impact on the gut microbiota and metabolome. It should only be used for short periods of time and under the advice of a specialist. More studies are needed to evaluate its effectiveness in children with irritable bowel syndrome.
There is only a little evidence of its effectiveness in treating functional symptoms in inflammatory bowel disease from small studies that are susceptible to bias. More studies are needed to assess the true impact of this diet on health.

Role in non-celiac gluten sensitivity
FODMAPs that are present in gluten-containing grains have been identified as a possible cause of gastrointestinal symptoms in people with non-celiac gluten sensitivity, in place of, or in addition to, gluten and other proteins in gluten-containing cereals, named amylasetrypsin inhibitors (ATIs). The amount of fructans in these cereals is small. In rye they account for 3.6%–6.6% of dry matter, 0.7%–2.9% in wheat, and barley contains only trace amounts. They are only minor sources of FODMAPs when eaten in the usual standard amounts in the daily diet. Wheat and rye may comprise a major source of fructans when consumed in large amounts.

In a 2018 double-blind, crossover research study on 59 persons on a gluten-free diet with challenges of gluten, fructans or placebo, intestinal symptoms (specifically bloating) were borderline significantly higher after challenge with fructans, in comparison with gluten proteins (P=0.049). Although the differences between the three interventions was very small, the authors concluded that fructans are more likely to be the cause of gastrointestinal symptoms of non-celiac gluten sensitivity, rather than gluten. In addition, fructans used in the study were extracted from chicory root, so it remains to be seen whether the wheat fructans produce the same effect.

A 2018 review concluded that although fructan intolerance may play a role in non-celiac gluten sensitivity, it only explains some gastrointestinal symptoms, but not the  extra-digestive symptoms that people with non-celiac gluten sensitivity may develop, such as neurological disorders, fibromyalgia, psychological disturbances, and dermatitis; and that FODMAPs cause digestive symptoms when the person is hypersensitive to luminal distension.

A 2019 review concluded that wheat fructans can cause certain IBS-like symptoms, such as bloating, but they are not likely to cause immune activation nor extra-digestive symptoms since, in fact, many people with non-celiac gluten sensitivity report resolution of their symptoms after removing gluten-containing cereals while they continue to eat fruits and vegetables with high FODMAPs content in their diet.

See also 

 Carbohydrate metabolism
 Diet (nutrition)
 Dieting
 Digestion
 List of diets

References

Further reading

External links 
 Description of Monash University Low FODMAP diet and lists of available resources

Diets
Metabolism
Gastroenterology
Carbohydrates